San Francisco Jewish Film Festival is the oldest Jewish film festival in the world, and currently the largest with a 2016 attendance figure of 40,000 at screenings in San Francisco, Berkeley, Oakland, San Rafael, and Palo Alto. The three-week summer festival is held in San Francisco, California, usually at the Castro Theater in San Francisco and other cinemas in San Francisco, Berkeley, Oakland, San Rafael, and Palo Alto, and features contemporary and classic independent Jewish film from around the world. In 2015, the organization re-branded itself as the Jewish Film Institute, retaining the name "San Francisco Jewish Film Festival" for the annual film festival.

The San Francisco Jewish Film Festival also maintains an online archive of Jewish film, and holds individual film screenings throughout the year.

The festival was first held at the Roxie Theater in San Francisco in 1980. The current executive director is Lexi Leban and the program director is Jay Rosenblatt.

In 2009, the officials in charge of the event were criticized for the decision to the screen of a film about ISM activist Rachel Corrie. Writing in the N. California JWeekly, Dan Pine noted "If the Academy handed out an Oscar for community turmoil, the Rachel Corrie flap at this year’s San Francisco Jewish Film Festival would win handily."  Pine reported that some Jewish community members said that festival organizers "crossed a line into overtly anti-Israel propaganda" and that "Corrie, and now her parents, have worked to ostracize and delegitimize Israel." In a statement, festival Executive Director Peter Stein apologized "for not fully considering how upsetting this program might be." At the same time, the festival did not back down from its decision to screen the film.

The 36th festival was held between July 21 and August 7, 2016, in five locations around the Bay Area. The featured films included "Germans & Jews", and Director Janina Quint was scheduled to attended the screening. The 37th festival took place July 20 to August 6, 2017, in the same five Bay Area locations as previous years. The opening and closing films, Keep the Change and Bombshell: The Hedy Lamarr Story,  were both directed by women.

The 38th festival took place July 19 to August 5, 2018.

References

External links
San Francisco Jewish Film Festival
Jewish Film Institute
SF Jewish Film Festival Youtube Channel
SF Jewish Film Festival on Twitter

Film festivals in the San Francisco Bay Area
Jewish film festivals in the United States
Jews and Judaism in San Francisco
Film festivals established in 1980
1980 establishments in California